The Tasmanian Derby is a Listed Thoroughbred horse race for three-year-olds at set weights over a distance of 2200 metres at Elwick Racecourse in Glenorchy, Australia in February. Total prize money for the race is A$150,000.

History
 2012 the race was down graded to a Listed race.

Winners

 2023 – Dunkel
 2022 – The Nephew
 2021 – Explosive Jack
2020 – Vamos Raffa
2019 – Cossetot
2018 – Civil Disobedience
2017 – Northwest Passage
 2016 – Jerilderie Letter
 2015 – Geegees Classicboy
 2014 – Liberty Leader
 2013 – Ollie's Gold
 2012 – Methuselah
 2011 – Mourinho
 2010 – Geegees Blackflash
 2009 – Betwixt
 2008 – Mega Boss
 2007 – Currigee
 2006 – Esterel
 2005 – Phantom Thief
 2004 – Almost Never
 2003 – Dream Quest
 2002 – Moonah Brooke
 2001 – Party Boy
 2000 – Father Floyd
 1999 – Star Of Nime
 1998 – Suavity
 1997 – Ventura
 1996 – Devon Sun
 1995 – Napier Street
 1994 – Ashley Grove
 1993 – Pax-A-Million
 1992 – Charleston Party
 1991 – My Latin Boy
 1990 – King Of Belmont
 1989 – Bar Landy
 1988 – Firetap
 1987 – How's Sovereign
 1986 – Pavista
 1985 – Royal Work
 1984 – So Brikay
 1983 – Mr Jazz
 1982 – Palomine
 1981 – Pass The Baton
 1980 – Godsend

See also
 List of Australian Group races
 Group races

References

External links
Summer Racing Carnival
Tasmanian T.R.C.
Tasmanian racing industry restructure

Horse races in Australia
Sport in Hobart
Recurring sporting events established in 1915